Ruth 3 is the third chapter of the Book of Ruth in the Hebrew Bible or the Old Testament of the Christian Bible, part of the Ketuvim ("Writings"). This chapter contains the story of how on Naomi's advice, Ruth slept at Boaz's feet, Ruth 3:1-7; Boaz commends what she had done, and acknowledges the right of a kinsman; tells her there was a nearer kinsman, to whom he would offer her, and if that man refuses, Boaz would redeem her, Ruth 3:8-13; Boaz sends her away with six measures of barley, Ruth 3:14-18.

Text
The original text was written in Hebrew language. This chapter is divided into 18 verses.
 A large letter נ, a majuscula, occurs in the first word of  - לִינִי ("tarry, stay, lodge, pass the night") - which the smaller Masora ascribes to the Oriental or Babylonian textualists.

Textual versions
Some early witnesses for the text of this chapter in Hebrew are of the Masoretic Text, which includes the Aleppo Codex (10th century) and Codex Leningradensis (1008). Some fragments containing parts of this chapter were found among the Dead Sea Scrolls, i.e., 2Q16 (2QRutha; ~50 CE) with extant verses 1‑2, 4‑8, and 2Q17 (2QRuthb; ~50 BCE) with extant verses 13‑18, with only slight variations from the Masoretic Text.

There is also a translation into Koine Greek known as the Septuagint, made in the last few centuries BC. Extant ancient manuscripts of the Septuagint version include Codex Vaticanus (B; B; 4th century), Codex Alexandrinus (A; A; 5th century).

Verse 1

 Then Naomi her mother-in-law said to her, "My daughter, shall I not seek security for you, that it may be well with you?"
 "Security" (KJV: "rest"): The expression "security" or "rest" ("resting-place") is a quite specific in application, and would be right away understood to be a "home", which Naomi pointed for her daughter's heart. 
 "That it may be well with you" or "which shall (or may) be good for you." The latter, simpler translation is given by Carpzov and Rosenmüller, but the former is following a frequent idiomatic use of the expression, in which there is an exchange "from the relative in result to the relative in aim", so that אֲשֶׁר יִיטַב 'ă-sher yî-ṭaḇ "that it may be well" is equivalent to לְמַעַן יִיטַב lə-ma-'an yî-ṭaḇ; "to the end (that) it may be well" (see ;).

Verse 2
 Now Boaz, whose young women you were with, is he not our relative? In fact, he is winnowing barley tonight at the threshing floor.
 "Is he not our relative" (KJV: "Is not Boaz of our kindred"): Naomi opens her case, showing that she had been studying Boaz all through the harvest season. She might have also been studying Ruth to trace unmistakable evidence of mutual responsiveness and attachment, so she now had a matured scheme in her head, startin by bringing up Boaz's name at once, "Is he not our relative?" מודַעַת an abstract term meaning literally "acquaintance," but here "relative," or "kinsman" (see Ruth 2:1).
 "In fact, he is winnowing barley": Boaz as a "mighty man of wealth" assists personally in the winnowing of his barley, which was in a great heap on the floor, and even sleeps in the open threshing-floor to protect his grain from depredation.
 "Winnow": The winnowing process is performed by throwing up the grain, after being trodden down, against the wind with a shovel. The threshing-floor, which was commonly on the harvest-field, was carefully leveled with a large cylindric roller and consolidated with chalk, that weeds might not spring up, and that it might not chop with drought. The farmer usually remained all night in harvest-time on the threshing-floor, not only for the protection of his valuable grain, but for the winnowing. That operation was performed in the evening to catch the breezes which blow after the close of a hot day, and which continue for the most part of the night. This duty at so important a season the master undertakes himself; and, accordingly, in the simplicity of ancient manners, Boaz, a person of considerable wealth and high rank, laid himself down to sleep on the barn floor, at the end of the heap of barley he had been winnowing. 
 "Tonight in the threshingfloor": which afforded a fit opportunity of meeting with him, being at night, and out of the city, from his own house, and alone, and after a feast for his reapers and threshers of corn, seems, from Ruth 2:7 It was usual to have threshingfloors in an open place without the city, so to winnow at them, whereby the chaff was more easily separated from the corn, and that, in the evening, when in those countries there were the strongest breezes of wind to carry it off; hence the Targum here has it, "behold, he is winnowing the barley floor with the wind, which is in the night." For before the invention and use of fans in winnowing, it was only done by the wind carrying off the chaff, as the oxen trod the corn, for it was done in the threshingfloor, as here: hence Hesiod advises that the threshingfloors should be, "in a place exposed to wind"; and so Varro observes, the floor should be in the higher part of the field, that the wind might blow through it; to this manner of winnowing Virgil has respect. Nor was it unusual for great personages, owners of farms and fields, to attend and overlook such service. Pliny reports, that Sextus Pomponius, father of the praetor and prince of the hither Spain, presided over the winnowing of his reapers; so Gideon, another judge Israel, was found threshing wheat, .

Verse 4
[Naomi said to Ruth:] 
 "Then it shall be, when he lies down, that you shall notice the place where he lies; and you shall go in, uncover his feet, and lie down; and he will tell you what you should do."
 "Uncover his feet": or rather, "the place of his feet;" that is, the foot of his bed. See Ruth 3:7–8. The denominative word מַרְגְּלֺלתָיו - freely rendered in King James's version "his feet" - could be rendered "the parts about his feet." Simply means "the places occupied by the feet."
 "Uncover his feet, and lie down": These directions may appear strange, but according to the simplicity of rural manners in Bethlehem, it was a method of reminding Boaz of his duty as the kinsman of Elimelech. Boaz probably slept upon a mat or skin, so Ruth lay crosswise at his feet—a position in which Eastern servants frequently sleep in the same chamber or tent with their master; and if they want a covering, custom allows them that benefit from part of the covering on their master's bed. As these people at that time rest at night in the same clothes they wear during the day, there was no indelicacy in a stranger (even a woman) to put the extremity of this cover over her.

Verse 7

 And after Boaz had eaten and drunk, and his heart was cheerful, he went to lie down at the end of the heap of grain; and she came softly, uncovered his feet, and lay down.
 "Uncovered his feet, and lay down": See Ruth 3:4

Verse 8
 And it came to pass at midnight, that the man was afraid, and turned himself:
 and, behold, a woman lay at his feet.
 "Turned himself": - Rather, "bent forward," so as to feel what it was which was at his feet.

Verse 13

[Boaz said to Ruth:] "Stay this night, and in the morning it shall be that if he will perform the duty of a close relative for you—good; let him do it. But if he does not want to perform the duty for you, then I will perform the duty for you, as the Lord lives! Lie down until morning."
"Stay this night" (KJV: "Tarry this night"): or "lodge here tonight", and Ruth did stay, knowing Boaz's honorable intention for her own safety and honor, that she might not be exposed to danger or disgrace by returning home in the middle of the night. The Hebrew letter נ "nun" in the word ליני lî-nî for "stay" or "tarry" is larger than normal in the Hebrew text, which may be intended to attract the attention of the reader of its singularity, that a widow should stay with a man without any "diminution of her chastity", according to Buxtorf.
 "Good; let him do it" (KJV: "well, let him do the kinsman's part"): If that kinsman were marrying Ruth, and redeeming her husband's estate, it would be all very well and right according to law, including for Ruth (as Aben Ezra and Abendana interpret it),  seeing that kinsman was apparently also a very respectable man. The same writers (and others) observe, that the word "Tob", translated "well", is the name of the kinsman, derived from 'Tobias', thus R. Joshuah says, that Salmon (the father of Boaz), Elimelech (the father of Ruth's husband), and Tob (this near kinsman), were brothers.
 "As the Lord lives!": as an oath that he would marry her, and redeem the inheritance, if the other kinsman would not, as also stated in the Targum, "I say with an oath before the Lord, that as I have spoken unto thee, so will I do."

Verse 16
 When she came to her mother-in-law, she said, "Is that you, my daughter?"
 Then she told her all that the man had done for her.
 "Is that you, my daughter?" (KJV: "Who art thou, my daughter?"): The first possibility is in the dim twilight her mother-in-law was not sure at first who the young woman was, who entered the house at such an early time, but the address, "My daughter," shows that she had no difficulty in determining who the visitor was. Instead, there is "something arch" intended. "Are you Boaz's betrothed?" The particle may be rendered, "what" or "how", instead of "who"; and the sense be, "what had befallen her?" "what success had she had?" "how had things gone with her?" "was she married or not?" or rather, "had she got a promise of it?" or "was it likely that she should be married?" Geneva Study Bible notes: "Believing by her returning home that he had not taken her as his wife, she was astonished."

See also

Related Bible parts: , Deuteronomy 6, Deuteronomy 10, Deuteronomy 25, Ruth 1, Ruth 2

Notes

References

Bibliography

External links

Jewish
Ruth 3 Hebrew with Parallel English
Ruth 3 Hebrew with Rashi's Commentary

Christian
Ruth 3 English Translation with Parallel Latin Vulgate

03